General elections were held in American Samoa on 3 November 2020. Voters elected members of the Fono and the American Samoan delegate to the United States Congress.

Results

Governor & Lieutenant Governor

The governor of American Samoa is elected on a ticket with the lieutenant governor. Although candidates do affiliate with national political parties, they are elected on a nonpartisan basis.

Fono House of Representatives
The House of Representatives is the lower house of the American Samoa Fono (legislature). Although candidates do affiliate with national political parties, they are elected on a nonpartisan basis.

Delegate
The Delegate to the United States Congress represents American Samoa's at-large congressional district in the U.S. House of Representatives.

References

2020 American Samoa elections
American Samoa
Elections in American Samoa
Non-partisan elections
November 2020 events in Oceania